José Manuel Casado Bizcocho (born 9 August 1986) is a Spanish professional footballer who plays as a left-back.

Club career
Casado was born in Coria del Río, Province of Seville. After starting his youth career at Sevilla FC he finished it at FC Barcelona, only representing the Catalans' C team (soon to be extinct) and subsequently returning to his previous club, spending two seasons with reserves Sevilla Atlético in the Segunda División.

A defensive stalwart for the B's, Casado also appeared twice for the main squad during 2007–08, the first being on 11 November 2007 in a 3–2 away loss against Villarreal CF. In the following years, after the latter's relegation, two consecutive La Liga loans ensued, both in Andalusia: first with Recreativo de Huelva, where he played half of the season's matches, and newly promoted Xerez CD, where he was featured more but ultimately met the same fate, relegation.

Casado was definitely released by Sevilla in July 2010, signing a two-year deal with Rayo Vallecano. He was first choice in his debut campaign as the club returned to the top flight after an absence of eight years; he continued to start for the Madrilenians, collecting 29 yellow cards and two red over two seasons in the process.

On 29 September 2013, still recovering from a severe knee injury which prevented a move to Levante UD, Casado signed a 2+3 contract with fellow league side Málaga CF. He made his competitive debut on 8 February of the following year, playing the second half of the 4–1 away defeat to former club Rayo.

Casado was transferred to UD Almería on 30 January 2015 after agreeing to an 18-month deal. On 8 June, after their top-tier relegation, he was released.

On 27 August 2015, Casado joined Championship side Bolton Wanderers on a free transfer, signing a one-year contract. On 29 January of the following year, he left by mutual agreement.

In late January 2017, after almost a year without a club, Casado moved to CD Numancia after a successful trial.

References

External links

1986 births
Living people
People from Coria del Río
Sportspeople from the Province of Seville
Spanish footballers
Footballers from Andalusia
Association football defenders
La Liga players
Segunda División players
Segunda División B players
Tercera División players
FC Barcelona C players
Sevilla Atlético players
Sevilla FC players
Recreativo de Huelva players
Xerez CD footballers
Rayo Vallecano players
Málaga CF players
UD Almería players
CD Numancia players
Coria CF players
English Football League players
Bolton Wanderers F.C. players
Spanish expatriate footballers
Expatriate footballers in England
Spanish expatriate sportspeople in England